Raj Kumari Chauhan is a member of the 15th Lok Sabha of India. She represented the Aligarh constituency of Uttar Pradesh and is a member of the Bahujan Samaj Party (BSP) political party.

Posts Held

See also

List of members of the 15th Lok Sabha of India

References 

India MPs 2009–2014
Living people
People from Aligarh district
1969 births
Bahujan Samaj Party politicians from Uttar Pradesh
Lok Sabha members from Uttar Pradesh
Women in Uttar Pradesh politics
21st-century Indian women politicians
21st-century Indian politicians
Bharatiya Janata Party politicians from Uttar Pradesh